Brinson may refer to:

Brinson (rapper) (born 1989), American rapper
Brinson (surname), includes a list of people with the surname
Brinson, Georgia, U.S. town

See also